Palaeoloxodon naumanni, occasionally called Naumann's elephant, is an extinct species belonging to the genus Palaeoloxodon found in the Japanese archipelago during the Middle to Late Pleistocene around 330,000 to 24,000 years ago. It is named after Heinrich Edmund Naumann who discovered the first fossils at Yokosuka, Kanagawa, Japan. Fossils attributed to P. naumanni are also known from China and Korea, though the status of these specimens are unresolved, with some authors regarding these as belonging to separate species.

Description

Palaeoloxodon naumanni, like other members of the genus Palaeoloxodon had a parietal-occipital crest on the top of the head. In comparison to other Eurasian species of Palaeoloxodon, the parietal-occipital crest was only weakly developed. P. naumanni has a reconstructed shoulder height of 2 to 2.8 metres, with males being noticeably larger than females. The tusks were upward curving and somewhat twisted in males, but were relatively straight and untwisted in females, and reached a maximum length of about 2.2 to 2.4 m and a maximum diameter of 20 cm.

Discovery and nomenclature
In 1860, the first fossil record was found at Yokosuka and the bottom of Seto Inland Sea, Japan. Heinrich Edmund Naumann researched and reported these fossils in “Ueber japanische Elephanten der Vorzeit” (1882). Naumann classified the fossil as Elephas namadicus Falconer & Cautley. In 1924,  researched fossils which were found in Hamamatsu, Shizuoka and reported the elephant was a new subspecies and designated the fossil Elephas namadicus naumannni in “Notes on a fossil elephant from Sahamma, Totomi” (1924). Tadao Kamei identified Elephas namadicus naumanni as a new species, called Palaeoloxodon naumanni, from fossils found at Lake Nojiri. It has also been called Elephas naumanni. Remains from mainland China and Korea have been attributed to this species by some authors. However, other authors attribute the Chinese remains, which are considerably larger than Japanese P. naumanii, to the separate species P. huaihoensis, originally named as a subspecies of P. naumanni.

Distribution 
P. naumanni is known from hundreds of localities across the Japanese archipelago, north to Hokkaido, where during the Late Pleistocene it alternated with the woolly mammoth during warmer intervals. It is suggested to have preferred temperate forested habitats including broad-leaved trees and conifers.

Evolution and extinction 
The oldest known dates for the species date to around 330,000 years ago, replacing the earlier proboscidean Stegodon orientalis, which had arrived from mainland East Asia several hundred thousand years prior. The youngest reliable dates for the species are around 24,000 years Before Present (BP), during the early stages of the Last Glacial Maximum. Any younger dates were considered unreliable.

Relationship with humans 
Fossil of P. naumanni at Lake Nojiri in Nagano Prefecture dating to approximately 37,900 to 60,400 years BP have been found together with many lithic and bone tool artifacts, suggesting that the elephants were butchered by humans at the site.

See also
 Chūrui Naumann Elephant Museum

References

External links
 

Palaeoloxodon
Pleistocene proboscideans
Pleistocene mammals of Asia
Extinct animals of Japan
Fossil taxa described in 1924